"This Time Make It Funky" is a 1991 song by American singer–songwriter Tracie Spencer. This song is the third single from Spencer's second album, Make the Difference which was released in August of the previous year. The single was released on May 1, 1991. As stated in the title, the track samples many different hip-hop beats and rhythms as Spencer tells the DJ (Sir Spence) to "drop the bass...and make it funky".

Chart information
"This Time Make It Funky" disappointed on the charts, following the top–ten success of Spencer's previous two singles (This House and Save Your Love). The song reached #54 on The Billboard Hot 100 and #31 on the R&B Singles chart.

Music video
The 7" Mix was used for the music video. The music video begins with Spencer and dancers entering through a side door of a building. It features Spencer singing the song and Sir Spence performing his rap accompanied by dancers and light effects in the background.

Official versions/remixes

 LP Version – (5:27) 
 Radio Mix  – (4:26)
 7" Mix – (4:35)
 Extended Instrumental – (5:44)
 Extended Mix – (6:36)
 Short & Funky Mix – (3:59)
 T-Funk II – (5:38)
 Funky Guitar Mix – (5:37)

Charts

References

1991 singles
Tracie Spencer songs
1990 songs
Capitol Records singles
American hip hop songs